A. Hameed (born Shaikh Abdul Hameed; 1924 – 20 May 1991) was a Pakistani film score composer and music director. 

He started his career in Bombay cinema (in modern-day Bollywood) and later worked in Lollywood. The first Pakistani film he worked as a director was Anjaam (1957), however he earned his recognition in Pakistani film industry as a music composer.

Biography 
Shaikh Abdul Hameed was born in 1924 in Amritsar, British India (now India). He initially worked in Hindi film industry with Ghulam Haider as a pianist, and subsequently composed music for Anjaam (1957) and Bharosa (1977) films. 

His family later migrated to Pakistan following the partition in 1947 and worked in Pakistani films as a composer. His first hit film song that became very popular was in Raat Ke Rahi (1960 film). Then, in the same year, a widely popular film Saheli gained him a lot of recognition as a music composer. Another popular film Aulad (1962) followed with notable songs, "Naam le le ke tera hum to jiye jaen ge" (Naseem Begum), "Tum mile pyar mila ab koi armaan nahin" (Naseem Begum - Munir Hussain).  His next musical creation was film Tauba (1964). It made a great impact with its melodious tracks. Munir Hussain and Salim Raza's Qawali, "Na milta gar ye tauba ka sahaara hum kahaan jaate" and Noor Jehan's song "O re sanam dil yeh kaise bataye" became very popular.

Filmography

Popular film songs

Awards and recognition
Nigar Award for Best Music Director in Dosti (1971).

Death
A. Hameed died in Rawalpindi, Pakistan on 20 May 1991.

References

External links 
 

1924 births
1991 deaths
Hindi film score composers
Pakistani film score composers
Punjabi people
Nigar Award winners